Benoît Salmon (born 9 May 1974 is a French former professional road racing cyclist.   In 1999, Salmon won the young rider classification in the Tour de France and the overall title of the Grand Prix du Midi Libre.

Major results 

1992
 1st  Road race, National Junior Road Championships
1996 
 1st Flèche Ardennaise
 8th Overall Tour de l'Avenir
1997
 5th GP de Cholet-Pays de Loire
 8th Route Adélie
 9th La Flèche Wallonne
1998
 1st Overall Tour du Vaucluse
1st Stage 4
 3rd Classique des Alpes
 6th Overall Grand Prix du Midi Libre
1999
 1st Overall Grand Prix du Midi Libre
1st Stage 4
 1st  Young rider classification Tour de France
 2nd Classique des Alpes
 6th Tour du Haut Var
2000
 6th Paris–Camembert
 6th Classique des Alpes
2001
 2nd Overall Grand Prix du Midi Libre
1st Stage 6
 2nd Tour de Vendée
 3rd Overall Critérium du Dauphiné Libéré
 5th Classique des Alpes
 8th GP Ouest-France
 8th Trophée des Grimpeurs
2003
 2nd Classique des Alpes
 4th Road race, National Road Championships
2004
 3rd Road race, National Road Championships
 10th Overall Route du Sud
2005
 3rd Overall Route du Sud
 6th Overall Tour de l'Ain
 9th Tour du Doubs
2006
 4th Grand Prix de Wallonie
 7th Trofeo Melinda
 9th Overall Rhône-Alpes Isère Tour

Grand Tour general classification results timeline

References

External links

French male cyclists
Living people
1974 births
People from Dinan
Sportspeople from Côtes-d'Armor
Cyclists from Brittany